

Heathoberht (also Heathubeorht or Hathoberht) (died 801) was a medieval Bishop of London.

Heathoberht was consecrated between 796 and 798. He died in 801.

Notes

Citations

References

External links
 

Bishops of London
801 deaths
Year of birth unknown
8th-century English bishops